Sam Smith (born 6 June 1990 in Epsom, Surrey, England), is a former English rugby union player. He played on the wing.

Smith made his first grade debut in the LV= Cup for Harlequins against the Newcastle Falcons on 15 November 2009.

His father Simon Smith played for Wasps and gained 9 caps for England between 1985 and 1986. His mother rowed for Cambridge and Great Britain.

In 2014, Smith was signed by Worcester Warriors Director of Rugby Dean Ryan following the departure of wing David Lemi. Smith remained at the club until 2016, when he retired from rugby after a quadriceps injury not healing fully.

He now runs a coffee shop called Wayland's Yard at 6 Foregate Street in Worcester.

References

External links
Harlequins profile
London Irish 13–16 Harlequins

1990 births
Living people
People educated at Cranleigh School
English rugby union players
Harlequin F.C. players
Esher RFC players
Rugby union players from Epsom
Rugby union wings